In probability theory and statistics, a stochastic order quantifies the concept of one random variable being "bigger" than another.  These are usually partial orders, so that one random variable  may be neither stochastically greater than, less than nor equal to another random variable .  Many different orders exist, which have different applications.

Usual stochastic order
A real random variable  is less than a random variable  in the "usual stochastic order" if

where  denotes the probability of an event. In decision theory, under this circumstance B is said to be first-order stochastically dominant over A.

Characterizations
The following rules describe situations when one random variable is stochastically less than or equal to another.  Strict version of some of these rules also exist.
 if and only if for all non-decreasing functions , .
If  is non-decreasing and  then 

Other properties
If  and  then  (the random variables are equal in distribution).

Stochastic dominance
Stochastic dominance relations are a family of stochastic orderings used in decision theory:
 First-order stochastic dominance:  if and only if  for all  and there exists  such that .

There also exist higher-order notions of stochastic dominance. With the definitions above, we have .

Multivariate stochastic order
An -valued random variable  is less than an -valued random variable  in the "usual stochastic order" if

Other types of multivariate stochastic orders exist.

All three order types also have integral representations, that is for a particular order  is smaller than  if and only if  for all  in a class of functions .  is then called generator of the respective order.

Other dominance orders 
The following stochastic orders are useful in the theory of random social choice. They are used to compare the outcomes of random social choice functions, in order to check them for efficiency or other desirable criteria. The dominance orders below are ordered from the most conservative to the least conservative. They are exemplified on random variables over the finite support {30,20,10}.

In other words: . For example, .

Bilinear dominance, denoted , means that, for every possible outcome, the probability that  yields the better one and  yields the worse one is at least as large as the probability the other way around: for all x<y,  For example, .

Stochastic dominance (already mentioned above), denoted , means that, for every possible outcome x, the probability that  yields at least x is at least as large as the probability that  yields at least x: for all x, . For example, .

For example, .

Upward-lexicographic dominance is defined analogously based on the probability to return the worst outcomes. See lexicographic dominance.

Other stochastic orders

Hazard rate order
The hazard rate of a non-negative random variable  with absolutely continuous distribution function  and density function  is defined as

 for all ,
or equivalently if

Likelihood ratio order

Variability orders
If two variables have the same mean, they can still be compared by how "spread out" their distributions are.  This is captured to a limited extent by the variance, but more fully by a range of stochastic orders.

Convex order
Convex order is a special kind of variability order. Under the convex ordering,  is less than  if and only if for all convex , .

Laplace transform order
Laplace transform order compares both size and variability of two random variables. Similar to convex order, Laplace transform order is established by comparing the expectation of a function of the random variable where the function is from  a special class: . This makes the Laplace transform order an integral stochastic order with the generator set given by the function set defined above with  a positive real number.

Realizable monotonicity
Considering a family of probability distributions   on partially ordered space 
It means the existence of a monotone coupling. See

See also
Stochastic dominance
Stochastic - meaning of the term

References

Bibliography
 M. Shaked and J. G. Shanthikumar, Stochastic Orders and their Applications, Associated Press, 1994.
 E. L. Lehmann. Ordered families of distributions. The Annals of Mathematical Statistics, 26:399–419, 1955.